Veliki Borak is a suburban settlement of Belgrade, the capital of Serbia. It is located in the municipality of Barajevo.

Location 

Veliki Borak is located in the western part of the municipality, southwest of the municipal seat of Barajevo and 4 km east of the Ibarska magistrala (Highway of Ibar), but near the Belgrade-Bar railway.

History 

In the period of the First Serbian Uprising (1804-1813), this region produced many well-known names, among which the most famous ones are the  Sima Marković and the hero Milisav Čamdžija, who was the first among the rebels to enter the Belgrade fortress. The first National assembly in modern Serbian history was held in Veliki Borak in 1805. The priest Matija Nenadović was elected as the first President, and the Councilor of Belgrade district was Pavle Popović from Vranić. 

According to the local, oral tradition, the very first post office in Serbia was opened in Veliki Borak, being operational while the assembly and the council were seated in the village. It was located in the Milovanović house which was built just prior to the uprising, in 1802. At the time, the post delivery system was known as the "Tatar-menzil hane" network.

While the existence of the proper post office on such important location during the uprising, which would allow fast communication with the other, local rebel centers, the national postal service "Pošta Srbije" claims there are no written records to confirm that the post office was opened in Veliki Borak at the time. The company claims that the first post office was opened in the Knez Mihailova Street, in downtown Belgrade, in 1840.

As of 2022, the Milovanović house still stands, it is inhabited, and was renovated that year. It is built in the typical Serbian style of the day, with rock foundation and earthen walls. Despite claiming it has no records to confirm the 1800s post office in the village, the "Pošta Srbije" tried to purchase the Milovanović house, but the owners refused.

Characteristics 

It is a rural settlement, with a population of 1,287 (Census 2002).

References

Suburbs of Belgrade
Barajevo